General elections were held in Panama on Sunday, 2 May 2004, electing both a new President of the Republic and a new Legislative Assembly.

Results

President
For the second consecutive election, Martín Torrijos, son of former military ruler Omar Torrijos, was named the candidate of the Democratic Revolutionary Party (PRD); in 1999, he had lost to Mireya Moscoso. Torrijos ran on a platform of strengthening democracy and negotiating a free trade agreement with the US, and was supported by popular musician and politician Rubén Blades; Torrijos later made Blades the nation's tourism minister. Torrijos' primary rival was Guillermo Endara, who had served as president from 1990 to 1994. Endara ran as the candidate of the Solidarity Party, on a platform of reducing crime and government corruption. Endara and the other candidates also ran a series of negative ads highlighting the PRD's connections with former military ruler Manuel Noriega. Endara finished second in the race, receiving 31% of the vote to Torrijos' 47%.

Torrijos assumed office on 1 September 2004. Voters also elected his two vice-presidents, who run on party tickets in conjunction with the presidential candidates.

Legislative Assembly
In addition to its president and vice presidents, Panama elected a new Legislative Assembly (78 members), 20 deputies to represent the country at the Central American Parliament, and a string of mayors and other municipal officers.

The Panama City mayor race was won also by the PRD.  Mayor Juan Carlos Navarro was re-elected.

References

External links
Official Results (Panamanian Electoral Tribunal)
Panama elects  ex-dictator's son (BBC)
First election since Canal handover (The Guardian)

Panama
General election
Elections in Panama
Presidential elections in Panama